Byecroft Farm Complex, also known as "Old Congress," is a historic home and farm complex located in Buckingham Township, Bucks County, Pennsylvania. The oldest section of the main house was built in 1702, with three later additions.  It consists of a central block with three wings.  The central block was built in 1732, and is a 2 1/2-story, three bay coursed fieldstone structure.  The northeast wing consists of the original one-story structure built in 1702, with a second story added in 1775.  A wing to the southwest was added in 1775, and expanded to 2 1/2-stories about 1830.  In 1934-1935, a 1 1/2-story, two bay, addition was built onto the southwest wing. The house is reflective of the Georgian style.  Also on the property are the contributing Old Bye Barn (c. 1730), carriage house / studio (c. 1775), two-story frame barn, small carriage house / cottage, and pumphouse and well house.

It was added to the National Register of Historic Places in 1983.

References

Farms on the National Register of Historic Places in Pennsylvania
Georgian architecture in Pennsylvania
Houses completed in 1935
Houses in Bucks County, Pennsylvania
National Register of Historic Places in Bucks County, Pennsylvania
1702 establishments in Pennsylvania